Etienne Samuel Chapman (26 April 1876 – 2 December 1949) was an Australian rules footballer who played with Carlton in the Victorian Football League (VFL).

Chapman was educated at Scotch College and played his early football in the Victorian Football Association, for Fitzroy, St Kilda and South Melbourne.

A forward, Chapman joined Carlton for the 1897 VFL season, the inaugural league season. He played 13 games that year and kicked four of Carlton's five goals in their round six defeat of St Kilda at Junction Oval, to register their first ever VFL win.

In the 1898 VFL season, Chapman made a further 12 appearances.

Chapman was a VFL goal umpire from 1902 to 1913. He officiated in a total of 160 games, including grand finals in 1907, 1911 and 1913.

References

1876 births
Australian rules footballers from Melbourne
Carlton Football Club players
Australian Football League umpires
1949 deaths
People from East Melbourne